Shashank Attarde (born 4 November 1991) is an Indian cricketer. He made his List A debut on 8 October 2019, for Mumbai in the 2019–20 Vijay Hazare Trophy. He made his first-class debut on 9 December 2019, for Mumbai in the 2019–20 Ranji Trophy.

References

External links
 

1991 births
Living people
Indian cricketers
Mumbai cricketers
People from Jalgaon district
Cricketers from Mumbai